André Gustavo Cunha (born April 8, 1979 in Araçatuba), known as André Cunha, is a Brazilian footballer who plays for Penapolense as right-back.

Career statistics

References

External links

1979 births
Living people
Brazilian footballers
Association football midfielders
Campeonato Brasileiro Série A players
Campeonato Brasileiro Série C players
Sociedade Esportiva Palmeiras players
Associação Atlética Ponte Preta players
Clube Atlético Penapolense players
Esporte Clube XV de Novembro (Piracicaba) players
Fortaleza Esporte Clube players
Clube de Regatas Brasil players